The fourth season of the American television series Haven premiered on September 13, 2013, and consisted a total of 13 episodes. The show stars Emily Rose, Lucas Bryant and Eric Balfour.

Cast

Main cast 
 Emily Rose as Audrey Parker / Mara
 Lucas Bryant as Nathan Wuornos
 Eric Balfour as Duke Crocker

Recurring cast 
 Richard Donat as Vince Teagues
 John Dunsworth as Dave Teagues
 Adam "Edge" Copeland (credited as both Adam Copeland and WWE Superstar Edge) as Dwight Hendrickson
 Kate Kelton as Jordan McKee
 Colin Ferguson as William
 Emma Lahana as Jennifer Mason
 Christian Camargo as Wade Crocker
 Jayne Eastwood as Gloria Verrano
 Robert Maillet as Heavy
a  Credited as a special guest star.
b  Also credited in the cast bill in "Survivors".

Guest Stars 
 Nicole de Boer as Marion Caldwell
 Nicola Correia-Damude as Rhonda
 Kandyse McClure as Carrie Benson
 Craig Olejnik as Aiden Driscoll
 Darri Ingolfsson as Jack Driscoll
 Kenneth Mitchell as Cliff
 Danny Masterson as Anderson Harris
 Kris Lemche as Seth Byrne
 Michael Hogan as Lincoln Harker

Episodes

Production 

On April 9, 2013, Syfy renewed Haven for a fourth season of thirteen episodes, which premiered in September 2013. Production began on May 8, 2013, with the premiere picking up six months after the events of the season 3 finale. Former Eureka actor Colin Ferguson joined the cast as William, a stranger whose secret agenda leads him to Audrey. Emma Lahana and former Dexter actor Christian Camargo were cast in recurring roles as Jennifer Mason and Wade Crocker respectively.

Season 4 includes a social media storyline featuring a pair of paranormal investigators known as the Darkside Seekers who star in their own reality show while on a mission to expose Haven's secrets. Danny Masterson and Kris Lemche guest-starred in a cross-over episode ("Shot in the Dark") with Masterson playing the cameraman Anderson Harris and Lemche as the host of Darkside Seekers TV Seth Byrne.

Home media release

References

External links 

 
 List of Haven episodes at The Futon Critic
 List of Haven episodes at MSN TV

2013 American television seasons
4